Hamamelis vernalis, the Ozark witchhazel (or witch-hazel)
is a species of flowering plant in the witch-hazel family Hamamelidaceae, native to the Ozark Plateau in central North America, in Missouri, Oklahoma, and Arkansas.

Description
Hamamelis vernalis spreads by stoloniferous root sprouts. The leaves are dark green above, and glaucous beneath, and often persist into the early winter.

Flowering begins in mid winter and continues until early spring. The Latin specific epithet  means "spring-flowering".

Although often occurring with the related Hamamelis virginiana, H. vernalis does not intergrade, and can be distinguished by its flowering in late winter (December to March in its native range), rather than fall.

Cultivation and uses
Hamamelis vernalis is valued in cultivation for its strongly scented flowers appearing in late winter, when little else is growing. Several cultivars have been selected, mainly for variation in flower color, including 'Carnea' (pink flowers), 'Red Imp' (petals red with orange tips), and 'Squib' (vivid yellow flowers).

References

External links

 
   Missouri Botanical Garden, Kemper Center for Home Gardening:  Hamamelis vernalis

Hamamelidaceae
Flora of Arkansas
Flora of Missouri
Flora of Oklahoma
Ozarks
Endemic flora of the United States
Trees of the Plains-Midwest (United States)
Garden plants of North America
Flora without expected TNC conservation status